U.S. Route 310 (US 310) is a spur of historic U.S. Route 10, now Interstate 90. It passes through the states of Montana and Wyoming.

Route description
US 310 starts at a junction with US 14, US 16, and US 20 west of Greybull; Highway 789 continues north along US 310 through the desert. Near the town of Lovell, US 310 passes by Lovell Lakes before turning west through a brief stretch of farmland that extends into Cowley. From Cowley, the highway runs west to Deaver, then due north to Frannie, where it straddles the boundary between Big Horn County and Park County. Just to the north of Frannie, US 310 bends slightly to the west, so that the road is actually inside Park County by about 400 feet before reaching the Montana state line.  At the state line, Wyoming Highway 789 ends and US 310 continues northwest into the desert. At the junction with Montana Highway 72, US 310 turns north, passing through farmland and the towns of Bridger and Fromberg before running concurrently with US 212. The highway enters the city of Laurel, where US 212 continues onto I-90, and US 310 ends at Main Street.

History
Historically, US 310 intersected with US 10 at Laurel.  After 1986, when US 10 was decommissioned west of West Fargo, North Dakota, US 310 no longer connected to its "parent" route.

Major intersections

Notes

References

External links
 Endpoints of U.S. Highway 310

10-3
10-3
10-3
3
U.S. Route 310
U.S. Route 310
U.S. Route 310
U.S. Route 310
1926 establishments in Montana
1926 establishments in Wyoming